Khalid Hasan Shah was an Islamic religious leader and an exponent of modern Naqshbandi Sufism.

Birth
He was born in Allo Mahar, Pakistan. His father was Faiz-ul Hassan Shah.

Education
He gained secular knowledge during the day, and in the evening he studied Islam at the local maktab, where he learned the basics of Islamic law, jurisprudence, the Hadith, and Qur'anic exegesis. He passed a B.A. at Murray College, Sialkot. He received his elementary education and lessons in Urdu from his father, logic and philosophy from his grandfather.

Religious career
He lectured throughout Pakistan, and struggled for the establishment of Islamic law in Pakistan. He held the seat of his father as a debater in 1984 and worked for eight years. He joined Majlis-e-Tahaffuz-e-Khatme Nabuwwat and lead protests against Ahmadiyya Movement.

Death
He died in 1992, and was buried in Allo Mahar beside his father.

Family
He had one son and two daughters. His son, Sahabzada Syed Murtaza Amin, is also an orator of Islam lecturing in different parts of world.

See also 
Allo Mahar
Muhammad Jewan Shah Naqvi
Muhammad Channan Shah Nuri
Muhammad Amin Shah Sani
Faiz-ul Hassan Shah
Sahabzada Syed Murtaza Amin

References

People from Sialkot District
Naqshbandi order
1992 deaths
1934 births
Murray College alumni